Hezzab may refer to:
 Hezzab is a reciter of the Quran
 Bash Hezzab is a senior reciter of the Quran